is a Japanese freestyle skier, specializing in moguls.

Murata competed at the 2010 Winter Olympics for Japan. She placed 11th in the qualifying round of the moguls, advancing to the final, where she placed 8th.

As of April 2013, her best showing at the World Championships is 5th, in the 2013 dual moguls event.

Murata made her World Cup debut in February 2008. As of March 2013, she has one World Cup podium finish, taking bronze in the moguls event at Are in 2011/12. Her best World Cup overall finish in moguls is 15th, in 2012/13.

World Cup Podiums

References

1990 births
Living people
Olympic freestyle skiers of Japan
Freestyle skiers at the 2010 Winter Olympics
Freestyle skiers at the 2014 Winter Olympics
Freestyle skiers at the 2018 Winter Olympics
Sportspeople from Kitakyushu
Japanese female freestyle skiers
Asian Games medalists in freestyle skiing
Asian Games gold medalists for Japan
Asian Games silver medalists for Japan
Freestyle skiers at the 2017 Asian Winter Games
Medalists at the 2017 Asian Winter Games
21st-century Japanese women